Statistics of Guam League in the 1994 season.

Overview
Tumon Taivon won the championship.

References
RSSSF

Guam Soccer League seasons
Guam
Guam
football